The following outline is provides an overview of Sikhism, or Sikhi (its endonym).

Sikhism is a monotheistic religion—emphasizing universal selflessness and brotherhood—founded in the 15th century upon the teachings of Guru Nanak and the ten succeeding Gurus. It is the fifth-largest organized religion in the world, and one of the fastest-growing.

The sacred text and last Guru of Sikhism, Guru Granth Sahib, teaches humans how to unite with the all cosmic soul; with God, the creator: "Only those who selflessly love everyone, they alone shall find God."

Scripture and literature

Scripture 
 Guru Granth Sahib — the sacred text and last Guru of Sikhism
Asa Di Var — 24 stanzas used as a morning prayer
Bhattan De Savaiye
Japji Sahib — the first 8 pages of the Guru Granth Sahib, consisting of hymns composed by Guru Nanak.
Kirtan Sohila
Laavaan — the four hymns of the Anand Karaj (Sikh wedding ceremony)
Mul Mantar — the opening words of the Guru Granth Sahib, citing the basic statement of creed in Sikhism.
Rehras — evening prayer
Sukhmani Sahib ('Psalm of Peace') — a popular set of hymns in the Guru Granth Sahib, divided into 24 sections
Ragmala
Dasam Granth — the secondary holy book of Sikhism
33 Savaiye
Benti Chaupai
Chandi di Var
Jaap Sahib — a morning prayer consisting of an introductory sloka, 38 stanzas (pauris), and a concluding sloka attributed by some to Guru Angad.
Tav-Prasad Savaiye (or Amrit Savaiye) — short composition of 10 stanzas, as part of nitnem
Sarbloh Granth — a voluminous scripture consisting of more than 6,500 poetic stanzas, considered as amalgamation of the writings of poets including Guru Gobind Singh.
Varan Bhai Gurdas — the name given to the 40 vaars (a form of Punjabi poetry) wrriten attributed by Bhai Gurdas, providing early concepts of Sikhism and Sikh living.

Sikh literature 

 Guru Maneyo Granth — historic statement of the 10th Guru, Guru Gobind Singh
Janamsakhi — non-canonical history of Guru Nanak
 Bala Janamsakhi — a collection of janamsakhis by Bhai Bala (generally accepted as authoritative).
 Mani Singh Janamsakhi or Gyan ratanavali — a collection dating from the time of the last Guru.
 Miharban Janamsakhi — janamsakhis written by the followers of Prithi Chand.
 Puratan Janamsakhi — an early collection of janamsakhis by an unknown author.
 Panth Parkash — non-canonical Sikh history
Suraj Parkash — non-canonical Sikh history
 Zafarnama — letter by Guru Gobind Singh to Aurangzeb

Associated terms 
Ardās
Bhagat Bani — any of the writings that appear in the Guru Granth Sahib which were not written by the Gurus.
Gurbani (abbreviated as bani) — general term for Gurus' writings
 Gutka — a small sized breviary or prayer book containing chosen hymns (banis) from Sikh scriptures
Nitnem — daily recitations
Paath
Savaiya — a form of poetry written in praise of someone, in which every verse is 1/4 times the length of a common verse.
Shabda — the hymns contained in Sikh scriptures.
Sloka — 'stanza'; the Sanskrit epic metre formed of 32 syllables: verses of 2 lines (distich) of 16 syllables each or in 4 half-lines (hemistich) of 8 syllables each.

Philosophy and beliefs 

Waheguru — God
Akal
Akal Purakh
Ik Onkar (or Ek Onkar)
Monoism
Nirguna
Nirbau, Nirvair — Without fear and Without hate
Sarav viāpak
Sarguna
Satguru — 'true God'
Satnam — '[God's] name is true'
3 pillars of Sikhism
 Naam Japo — meditation on the name of God
 Kirat Karo — earning a living honestly, without exploitation or fraud
 Vand Chhako — sharing with others; helping those with less or those who are in need
5 Virtues
Sat — 'truth'
Santokh — 'contentment, satisfaction'
Daya — 'compassion, kindness'
Nimrata — 'humility, benevolence'
Pyaar — 'love'
Bole So Nihal
Charhdi Kala — the aspiration to maintain a mental state of eternal optimism and joy.
Five Thieves
 Kaam — 'lust'
 Krodh — 'anger, wrath'
 Lobh — 'greed'
 Moh — 'attachment'
 Hankaar — 'ego, pride'
 Gurmat
Hukam
Idolatry in Sikhism
Khalsa — 'pure'
Nirguni bhakti
Raj Karega Khalsa
Sarbat da bhalla — welfare (bhalla) of mankind (sarbat)
Seva — selfless service
Shakti
Sikh Rehat Maryada – code of conduct
Simran — the remembrance of Waheguru.

Relation to other religions 

Hinduism and Sikhism
Islam and Sikhism
Jainism and Sikhism

Practices and culture 

 Amrit — elixir of immortality; the sanctified nectar or sugar water substitute used in ceremonies. It is prepared by stirring it in an iron bowl with the double-edged sword and continuous recitation of five banis by the five selected members of the Khalsa.
Dasvand — a kind of Sikh tithe; the act of donating 10% of one's harvest, both financially and in the form of time and service (i.e., seva) to the Gurdwara and community.
Five Ks — five articles of faith worn by baptised, or khalsa, Sikhs:
Kesh — uncut hair
Kangha — a comb
Kara — a circular iron bracelet
Kirpan — a small dagger
Kachera — special underwear short
Kirtan — musical recitation
 Langar — communal kitchen where free food is distributed to all comers
Pangat
Naam Japo — meditation on the name of God
Jaap — 'recitation'
Prohibitions (kurahit kurahat), including:
Cutting, trimming, shaving or removing hairs from one's body — Sikhs practice kesh, allowing their hair to grow out naturally in respect to God's creation
Intoxication
Castism
Kutha meat — eating meat killed in a ritualistic manner (particularly halal or kosher meat), or any meat where langar is served (except jatkha meat).
Seva — selfless service
Sevadar — one who volunteers
Kar seva
Kar sevak
Sikh Rehat Maryada — code of conduct

Sikh ceremonies 
 Anand Karaj ('blissful union, joyful union') — the Sikh marriage ceremony, first introduced by Guru Amar Das.
Akhand Path — continuous reading of Sri Guru Granth Sahib, either in honour of a particular occasion or simply to increase one's feeling of connection to God. Akhand Paths can be held, for example, in honour of a birth/birthday, wedding/anniversary, recovery from a medical operation, death, or a historic occasion; to celebrate the achievement of a goal such as a graduation or passing the driving test; or in chasing away evil spirits and curses, etc.
Amrit Sanchar — baptism into the Khalsa tradition
 Antam Sanskar — funeral rites
Naam Karan — child's naming ceremony
Sadharan Paath

Sikh festivals 

 Bandi Chhor Divas — a celebration during Diwali
 Gurpurab — the celebration of an anniversary of a Guru's birth, particularly that of Guru Nanak.
Guru Ladho Re Diwas
Mela Maghi
Nagar Kirtan
Vasakhi — a festival during late Spring

General Sikh culture 
 Dastar — turban (pagri); an inseparable part of Sikh dress that is mandatory for Sikh males according to Guru Granth Sahib and the Sikh Rehat Maryada.
Diet in Sikhism
Gatka — Sikh martial art
Idolatry in Sikhism
Karah Parshad
Khanda — an Indian-double edged sword that is used as the primary symbol of the Sikh faith. It appears on the Nishan Sahib that flies over gurdwaras.
Kirtan — musical recitation
Nanakshahi calendar — the calendar used in Sikhism
Chet
Vaisakh
Jeth
Harh
Sawan
Bhadon
Assu
Katak
Maghar
Poh
Magh
Phagun
Punjabi language
Gurmukhi — the written form of Punjabi used in the Sikh scriptures (and in Punjab, India, more generally) propagated by Guru Nanak and Guru Angad. It is contrast to shahmukhi, which is the Islamic script for Punjabi (used in Punjab, Pakistan).
Sant Bhasha
Ragi — Sikh musician who performs hymns
Sikhism and sexual orientation

Sikh geography 

 Akal Takhat ('Eternal Throne') — nominal seat of Sikh temporal/political authority.
 Amritsar — the holy city of Sikhism, home to 1.5 million in the northwestern part of India.
Harmandir Sahib (or Golden Temple) — the holy shrine of Sikhs; the spiritual and cultural center of the Sikh religion, found in Amritsar.
 Anandpur Sahib — the birthplace of the Khalsa
Virasat-e-Khalsa — a Sikh museum in Anandpur
 Goindval Sahib
 Kartarpur — seat of Guru Nanak's first school.
 Nankana Sahib — birthplace of Guru Nanak
Patna Sahib
 Samadhi of Ranjit Singh — a building in Lahore, Pakistan that houses the funerary urns of Sikh ruler Ranjit Singh 
Takht

Sikhism by country 

 Sikhism in Australia
 Sikhism in Afghanistan
 Sikhs in Belgium
 Sikhism in Canada
 Sikhs in Fiji
 Sikhism in India
 Sikhism in New Zealand
 Sikhism in Pakistan
 Sikhism in Thailand
 Sikhism in the United Arab Emirates
 Sikhism in the United Kingdom
 Sikhism in the United States

Gurdwaras

In India

The Harmandir Sahib (or Golden Temple) is the holy shrine of Sikhs; the spiritual and cultural center of the Sikh religion, found in Amritsar. The Shiromani Gurudwara Parbandhak Committee (SGPC) is the organization responsible for the management of gurdwaras in the states of Punjab, Haryana, and Himachal Pradesh, and the union territory of Chandigarh 

Other gurdwaras in India include:
 Gurdwara Bangla Sahib
 Gurdwara Sri Tarn Taran Sahib
 Goindwal Sahib

In the United States

 Gurdwara Sahib Fremont
 Sikh Gurdwara - San Jose
 Sikh Gurdwara of San Francisco
 Sikh Religious Society of Chicago

Gurdwaras in Pakistan

 Kartarpur — seat of Guru Nanak's first school.
 Nankana Sahib — birthplace of Guru Nanak.

Other gurdwaras 
 Gurdwaras in Canada
Khalsa Diwan Sikh Temple (Hong Kong)
Gurdwara Sahib Klang (Malaysia)

 Central Sikh Temple — the first gurdwara in Singapore
 Gurdwara Sri Guru Singh Sabha Southall (London)

Other Sikh institutions 
 Damdami Taksal
Guru Nanak Dev University
 Guru Nanak Khalsa College of Arts, Science & Commerce
 Khalsa College, Amritsar
Pingalwara
 Satnam Trust
Sikh American Legal Defense and Education Fund
Sikh Phulwari
Sikh Reference Library
Thai Sikh International School

Sikh politics, military, and administration

Organizations 

All India Sikh Students Federation
 British Sikh Student Federation
Delhi Sikh Gurdwara Management Committee
Ghadar Party
Haryana State Akali Dal
Punjab Janata Morcha
Shiromani Akali Dal
Sarb Hind Shiromani Akali Dal
Shiromani Akali Dal (Amristsar)
 Shiromani Akali Dal Delhi
Shiromani Akali Dal (Democratic)
 Shiromani Akali Dal (Longowal)
 Shiromani Akali Dal (Panthik)
 Shiromani Gurudwara Parbandhak Committee (SGPC) — the organization responsible for the management of gurdwaras in the states of Punjab, Haryana, and Himachal Pradesh, and the union territory of Chandigarh
Sikh Manji — Sikh administrative unit
United Sikhs
World Sikh Organization

Military 

Misl
Piri System
Sant Sipahi
Sikh Empire
Sikh Khalsa Army
Sikh Light Infantry
 Sikh Regiment

Movements 
 Akali movement
 Babbar Akali movement
Ghadar movement
 Khalistan movement — a separatist movement to create a Sikh homeland, often named Khālistān ('Land of the Khalsa'), composed of the Punjab region of modern-day India and Pakistan.
 Singh Sabha Movement

History of Sikhism

 1469–1539 — Time of Guru Nanak
1606 — Guru Arjan executed succeeded bu Guru Hargobind who start the Sikh martial tradition.
1675 — Guru Tegh Bahadur executed for protesting for religious freedom
1699 — Khalsa Sajana Divas
1708 — Guru Granth Sahib becomes eternal Guru
1710–1715 — Banda Singh's Raj
1716–1799 — Sikh Confederacy
1752–1801 — Sukerchakia
1746 — Chhota Ghallughara ('small massacre') — a massacre of a significant proportion of the Sikh population by the Mughal Empire, in which Jaspat Rai's brother Lakhpat Rai with the Mughal army killed an estimated 7,000 Sikhs died.
1762 — Vadda Ghalughara ('large massacre') — a mass-murder of unarmed Sikhs by the Afghan forces of the Durrani Empire, during the years of Afghan influence in the Punjab region.
1799–1849 — Sikh Empire
1845–46 — First Anglo-Sikh War
1848–49 — Second Anglo-Sikh War
1897 — Battle of Saragarhi — a last-stand battle during the British Raj
1919 April 13 — Jallianwalla Bagh Massacre (or Amritsar Massacre)
1920–25 — Akali movement
1984 June 1–8 — Operation Blue Star — a military operation inside the Harmandar Sahib
1984 November — 1984 anti-Sikh riots
2012 August 5 — Wisconsin Sikh temple shooting

Battles 

 1621 — Battle of Rohilla
 1634 — Battle of Lahira
 1634 — Battle of Amritsar (1634)
 1635 — Battle of Kartarpur
 1686 September — Battle of Bhangani
 1691 — Battle of Nadaun
 1696 — Battle of Guler
 1700 — Battle of Anandpur (1700)
 1700 — Second Battle of Anandpur
 1701 — Battle of Anandpur (1701)
 1702 — Battle of Basoli
 1702 — Battle of Nirmohgarh
 1702 — First Battle of Chamkaur.
 1704 — First Battle of Anandpur (1704)
 1704 December — Battle of Sarsa
 1704 December 6 — Second Battle of Chamkaur.
 1705 December 29 — Battle of Muktsar
 1709 — Battle of Sonepat
 1709 — Battle of Samana
 1710 — Battle of Sadhaura
 1710 — Battle of Rahon
 1710 — Battle of Jalalabad
 1710 May — Battle of Chappar Chiri
 1710 December — Battle of Lohgarh
 1712 — Battle of Jammu
 1715 — Siege of Gurdaspur
1715 April — Battle of Gurdas Nangal
 1757 — Battle of Amritsar (1757)
 1759 — Battle of Lahore (1759)
 1761 — Battle of Sialkot (1761)
 1761 — Battle of Gujranwala
 1761 — Sikh Occupation of Lahore
1762 — Battle of Harnaulgarh
1762 February 5 — Battle of Kup
 1763 —Battle of Sialkot (1763)
 1764 —Battle of Sirhind
 1783 — Capture of Delhi and Red Fort
1809 March–August — Gurkha-Sikh War
 1813 July 13 — Battle of Attock
1818 March–June — Battle of Multan
1819 July 3 — Battle of Shopian
 1834 — Battle of Peshawar
 1837 — Battle of Jamrud
1841–42 — Sino-Sikh War
1845 December — Battle of Mudki
1845 December — Battle of Ferozeshah
 1846 — Battle of Baddowal
 1846 January — Battle of Aliwal
 1846 February — Battle of Sobraon
1848 November — Battle of Ramnagar
1848 April–1849 January — Siege of Multan
1849 January — Battle of Chillianwala
 1849 — Battle of Gujrat
1897 — Battle of Saragarhi

People
Sikhs are members of the Sikh religion. A sangat is a society or congregation of Sikhs.

Titles and labels 

Amritdhari — baptized Sikh; anyone who has been initiated into the Khalsa, according to Sikh Reht Maryada.
Brahmgiani — highly enlightened individual who has obtained the ultimate blessings of Waheguru.
Granthi — the Sikh that reads Guru Granth Sahib
Gurmukh — a person who is spiritually centered. A person who lives within the will of God and accepts all good and bad that happens to one's self without question or annoyance. A gurmukh stands in contrast to a manmukh.
Gursikh
Gyani
Jathedar
Jathedar of Akal Takht
Kar sevak
Manmukh — a self-centered person, contrast to gurmukh. A person who lives within the will of the Mind as opposed to the will of god.
Nihang — a warrior Sikh
Nirankari — an offshoot of Sikhism
Patit — apostate
Sahajdhari — unbaptized Sikh.
Sant Sipahi
Sardar — a word contemporarily used to address or denote a turban-wearing Sikh male. The term initially used by Sikh leaders and generals who held important positions in various Sikh Misls of the Sikh Empire.
Sevadar — one who volunteers for seva
Shaheed — title used before the name of a person who has died as a Sikh martyr.
Saka Sirhind
Sikh names
Kaur ('princess') — the middle name or surname given to Sikh females
Singh ('lion') — the middle name or surname given to Sikh males

Udasi — a religious sect of ascetic sadhus who were key interpreters of the Sikh philosophy and the custodians of important Sikh shrines until the Akali movement. Modern-day udasis consider themselves more to be Hindu rather than Sikhs.

Sikh Gurus 

 Guru Nanak Dev — According to the traditional historical Sikh sources Guru Nanak Dev appeared on earth in the month of Katak Oct/November 1469 which is celebrated every year in the month of October/November. The SGPC which was founded in 1925, states the avtar date as 15 April 1469. The Sikhs believe that all subsequent Gurus possessed Guru Nanak's divinity and the one spirit of Akaal Purakh Waheguru.
Guru Angad Dev (1504–52) — disciple of Guru Nanak Dev and second of the ten Sikh Gurus.
Guru Amar Das (1479–1574) — third of the ten Sikh Gurus.
Guru Ram Das ( 1534–81) — fourth of the ten Sikh Gurus.
Guru Arjan Dev (1563–1605) — fifth of the ten Sikh Gurus.  He was arrested and executed by Jahangir in 1605.
Guru Har Gobind (1596–1638) — son of Guru Arjan Dev and the sixth of the ten Sikh Gurus.
Guru Har Rai (1630–61) — grandson of Guru Har Gobind and seventh of the ten Sikh Gurus.
Guru Har Krishan (1656–64) — son of Guru Har Rai and eighth of the ten Sikh Gurus.
Guru Tegh Bahadur (1621–75) — grand uncle of Guru Har Krishan and ninth of the ten Sikh Gurus. He was executed on the orders of Mughal Emperor Aurangzeb in Delhi.
Guru Gobind Singh(1666–1708) — son of Guru Tegh Bahadur and tenth of the ten Sikh Gurus.  He named the holy scripture, as his successor
Guru Granth Sahib — the spiritual religious text of Sikhism, said to be the sole and final successor of the line of gurus. It is the eternal living Guru. the final and eternal guru of the Sikhs.

Notable people 

 Pre-1400
Jayadeva — a Sanskrit poet who is the earliest-dated author of two hymns in the Guru Granth Sahib.
1400–1499
 Bhagat Beni
Bhai Mardana — Guru Nanak's constant Muslim companion, musician, and composer of Sikh hymns.
 Bhai Lalo
 Bibi Nanki — Guru Nanak's sister and often considered his first disciple.
 Sri Chand — Guru Nanak's son and founder of an early Sikh sect.
 1500–1599
 Baba Buddha — one of the most revered Sikh saints and anointer of several of the early Sikh Gurus.
 Bhai Gurdas — one of the most revered Sikh saints and writer of the Vars.
 Bhai Bala
 Mian Mir
 1600–1699
 Panj Pyare (or Panj Piare; literally 'five beloved ones') — the title given to five Sikhs by Guru Gobind Singh at the historic divan at Anandpur Sahib on 30 March 1699, forming the nucleus of the Khalsa as the first batch to receive at his hands Khanda di Pahul (i.e. rites of the two-edged sword). These five Sikhs were:
 Bhai Daya Singh
 Bhai Dharam Singh
 Bhai Himmat Singh
 Bhai Mohkam Singh
 Bhai Sahib Singh
Moti Ram Mehra
 Bhai Mani Singh
 Pir Budhan Shah
 Baba Bidhi Chand
 Bhai Kanhaiya
Chhotte Sahibzade
 1700–1799
 Banda Singh Bahadur
 Baba Deep Singh
 Bhai Taru Singh
 Tara Singh Wan
 Jassa Singh Ahluwalia
 Jassa Singh Ramgarhia
 1800–1899
 Akali Phula Singh
 Baba Nand Singh ji
 Maharajah Ranjit Singh
 Nawab Kapur Singh
 Baba Ram Singh
 Pundit Tara Singh
 1900–1999
 Bhagat Puran Singh
 G. B. Singh
Baba Gurdit Singh
 Giani Gurdit Singh
 H. S. Phoolka
Sant Baba Harnam Singh
 Ishar Singh
Bhai Kahn Singh Nabha
Bhai Randhir Singh
Giani Sant Singh Maskeen
Bhai Vir Singh

General concepts 

 Brahmavidya — knowledge of the Divine
 Vand Chhako — charity (or daan); one of the three petitions, alongside naam and ishnan.
 Dasvand — 10% of earnings donated to the less advantaged.
 Gurbani (abbreviated as bani) — verses; applied to any of the collective writings of the Sikh Gurus that appear in the Guru Granth Sahib.
 Gurdwara (or gurudwara; literally 'God's door, God's place') — Sikh place of worship
 Ik Onkar (or Ek Onkar) — One formless, genderless universal Lord called Wahguru
 Ishnan — , purification of body and mind; one of the three petitions, alongside naam and daan.
 Jaap — recite.
 Kirat Karo — earning a living honestly, without exploitation or fraud
 Laavaan
 Naam — remembrance of the Divine name
Naam Japo — meditation on the name of God
 Takhat
 Tankhah — social offense, such as giving dowry, using liquors and intoxicants, raising monuments over graves, and associating with apostates.

Pop culture 

 Chaar Sahibzaade: Rise of Banda Singh Bahadur
 Sarbloh Warriors — a computer game based around Sikh resistance against Mughal rule
 Singh Is Kinng (2008)

See also
 Glossary of Sikhism (alphabetical)
 Interfaith dialog

References

External links 

 Sikh Philosophy Network An Online Sikh Discussion Forum
 Sikh-heritage.co.uk

 1
 
Outlines of religions
Wikipedia outlines